Darreh Garm (also known as Bābā Pīrī-ye Darreh Garm, Bābā Pīr Pā‘īn, and Darreh Garm-e Aḩmad Hārūn) is a village in Javid-e Mahuri Rural District, in the Central District of Mamasani County, Fars Province, Iran. At the 2006 census, its population was 63, in 11 families.

References 

Populated places in Mamasani County